The Zambezi parrotfish (Cyphomyrus discorhynchus) is an elephantfish in the family Mormyridae. It occurs in several river and lake systems across Central Africa and the northern half of Southern Africa.

References 

Weakly electric fish
Mormyridae
Fish of Africa
Fish described in 1852
Taxa named by Wilhelm Peters